Darren Lyndon Espanto (born May 24, 2001) is a Filipino-Canadian singer, and actor.

He first joined a competition at the age of ten, where he won the Masters Finals of the Pinoy Singing Sensation competition in Edmonton. He made his first television appearance at the same age when he joined YTV's reality television The Next Star in 2012; he became the youngest finalist in the history of the show to be included in the Top 6. However, he rose to prominence after joining the first season of The Voice Kids Philippines. On June 1, 2014, Espanto became a part of ABS-CBN's Star Magic.

Espanto released his first full-length self-titled studio album, Darren in December 2014, under MCA Music Inc. (Philippines), a Universal Music Group company. It debuted at number 1 on the Philippine charts of Apple's iTunes store and Astro Chart; it is now a certified Double Platinum. In May 2015, Espanto staged a major solo concert at MOA Arena, he set a record for being the youngest artist to perform at the said venue at the age of 14. In May 2016, he released his sophomore album titled Be with Me, also under MCA Music Inc. (Philippines), featuring his carrier single "7 Minutes", that was then followed by "Starlight" and "Parachute", which also became number 1 on the Philippine charts of Apple's iTunes store after just being released. The said album is now a certified Platinum. In August 2018, he later ventured into acting where he played Yohan (younger brother of George, portrayed by Bernardo) in The Hows Of Us starring Kathryn Bernardo with Daniel Padilla directed by Cathy Garcia-Molina which happens to be one of the highest-grossing Philippine movies of all time to date.

In April 2019, Espanto was the only Filipino artist invited as a guest performer in the grand finals of Singer 2019 in China. Espanto, along with Asia's Phoenix Morissette, was also handpicked by Disney to perform the rendition of "A Whole New World" as part of the Philippine promotion of the movie Aladdin in May 2019. In November 2019, the theme song for the ASEAN-ROK Commemorative Summit titled "Side by Side" was launched, where he participated as one of the 11 ASEAN singers representing each member country. The same month, he released his original composition, "Sasagipin Kita", also under MCA Music Inc. (Philippines). The song debuted at number 1 on the Philippine charts of Apple's iTunes store on the first day of its release. In April 2020, Espanto was appointed by the United Nations Development Programme (under its Philippine office) as its first-ever celebrity Youth Advocate to promote its Sustainable Development Goals or SDGs, focusing on climate action, biodiversity conservation and youth empowerment. In November 2020, Espanto released "Believe in Christmas" under MCA Music Inc. (Philippines) which debuted at number 1 of Apple's iTunes store Philippines two hours upon its release. In May 2021, Espanto released his latest single, "Tama Na", under MCA Music Inc. (Philippines) which climbed to number 3 of Apple's iTunes store Philippines in the first two hours of its release. In November 2021, Espanto represented the Philippines in the world renowned Expo 2020 Dubai along with December Avenue. In April 2022, Espanto released "Pabalik Sa'yo", under UMG Philippines which also climbed to number 3 of Apple's iTunes store Philippines an hour after its release. In June 2022, Espanto is one of the Southeast Asian artists with whom Calum Scott collaborated for the version of Scott's track, "Heaven". The song climbed to No. 2 of iTunes store Philippines immediately after its release. In July 2022, it was announced that Espanto is one of the artists included in the newly launched Republic Records Philippines under UMUSIC Philippines.

Personal life

Espanto was born in Calgary on May 24, 2001. He is the first child of Filipino registered nurses Marinel Gonzales and Lyndon Espanto, who emigrated to Canada from Isabela. Espanto also has a younger sister, Lynelle. His parents taught him Filipino language, particularly Tagalog. Espanto started singing at the age of three
. He was interested in singing from a young age, and his parents were supportive of his dreams.

As a toddler, Espanto serenaded to his parents with the tunes of Hakuna Matata from The Lion King, which led to his relatives discovering his singing potential and urging him to pursue and hone his raw talent.

At age 12, Espanto attended Grade 6 at St. Jude Elementary in Calgary, before traveling to the Philippines in 2014 for The Voice Kids. After passing the auditions, he returned to Canada to write his advanced test in St. Cyril School. Afterwards, he returned to the Philippines. Espanto, along with the other The Voice Kids finalists, received a ₱350,000 scholarship from Eton International School. Upon moving to the Philippines, he went to Eton International School and later on took up homeschooling under The Homeschool of Asia Pacific, an affiliate of the Sanston Academy (Texas) where he completed his senior high school with honors. In Grade 11, he was awarded with second honors. In Grade 12, he graduated with first honors and received two special awards, i.e., the Achiever Award and the Excellence in Music and Arts Award.

Career
At age 10, Espanto won during the Main Edition Finals of the Pinoy Singing Sensation competition in Edmonton on August 20, 2011.

2012–2013: The Next Star

In 2012, ten-year-old Espanto auditioned for the fifth season of YTV's reality television The Next Star, singing Bruno Mars' "Grenade". One of the judges, Keshia Chanté, got emotional and told him that his voice was 'unbelievable' and 'controlled'. Judge Mark Spicoluk, on the other hand, stated that he 'lacked stage presence'. Nevertheless, after Chante asked him if he was ready, she and Tara Oram said yes, earning him the 'golden ticket'.

He continued to be selected onto its Top 6, singing pop songs such as Rihanna's "Only Girl (in the World)" and Maroon 5's "Payphone" among others. He also had his own single and music video entitled "Gotta Give A Little Extra", as well as two other singles, "Now" and "Oh Oh Santa" with the other five finalists. Ultimately, he lost to 14-year-old Brooklyn Roebuck, after singing his own single during the finals. He was the youngest finalist in the history of the show to be included in the Top 6.

In 2013, Espanto had his first series as a guest in YTV's Life with Boys.

2014: The Voice Kids

During the auditions of the inaugural season of ABS-CBN's The Voice Kids that aired on June 1, 2014, Espanto performed Jessie J's "Domino", which he formerly sang during The Next Star at age 11. Coaches Sarah Geronimo and Bamboo Mañalac both pressed their buttons for him, vocalizing that he 'can be groomed to be a recording artist, a total package'. Although Espanto revealed that he was Mañalac's front act during one of his concerts in Canada, he still picked Geronimo stating that she could help him a lot in the music industry.

Espanto eventually advanced to the finals after singing Whitney Houston's "One Moment in Time" during the live semi-finals held at the Newport Performing Arts Theater in Resorts World Manila, Pasay. He was the second one to receive the highest votes, after Lyca Gairanod. Lea Salonga, one of the coaches commented that Espanto is a phenomenal while his mentor Geronimo stated that he was 'a winner and a complete package'. He also sang "Somebody To Love" by Justin Bieber with some back up dancers, and Star Magic artists.

In the finale, during the first round which was a power ballad theme, Espanto performed Basil Valdez's song "Ngayon" where he received a standing ovation including from the three coaches. Lea Salonga left a warning to older performers, saying: "To every person Darren idolized, this is a warning to all of you: this kid will outshine you someday". Once again, Geronimo praised him and said that despite his talent, Espanto never showed superiority and instead listened to his coach. On the final round of the competition, Espanto accompanied himself with a piano during his performance of "You Are My Song" while having a duet with the original singer Martin Nievera, where received another standing ovation. At the end of the competition, he once again came in second after Lyca Gairanod.

2014–present: Post The Voice Kids
In 2014, Espanto said that he will not go back to Calgary, Alberta, and that he was staying in the Philippines to try acting and do a project with his coach and mentor, Sarah Geronimo. In August, Espanto became a part of ABS-CBN's training and management center Star Magic. On September 11, Espanto's rendition of Whitney Houston's "One Moment in Time" topped the Philippine charts of Apple's iTunes store, while his rendition of Justin Bieber's "Somebody to Love" placed second. He then staged his first solo concert at the Music Museum; a repeat of the concert was staged on December 19, 2014. On October 25, he made his Carnegie Hall debut as the headliner at the Fourth The Outstanding Filipino Americans in New York Awards, which celebrated Filipino American History Month in New York City. On November 18, his rendition of "O Little Town of Bethlehem" topped the iTunes chart, while his rendition of Jessie J's "Domino" placed second, in which the two were the only local songs to be included on the top 15. And on November 29, Espanto signed a record and management deal with MCA Music Inc. (Philippines). A week after, he and the other three finalists of The Voice Kids (Lyca Gairanod, Juan Karlos Labajo, and Darlene Vibares) held a concert at the Philippine International Convention Center. He also released his first solo album, "Darren", with MCA Music Inc. (Philippines). It debuted at number 1 at the Philippine charts of Apple's iTunes Store upon its release on December 8.

In January 2015, Espanto performed Trina Belamide's "Tell The World of His Love" (the theme for World Youth Day 1995) during Pope Francis's visit to the Philippines. On May 29, Espanto performed at the Mall of Asia Arena for his birthday concert making him the youngest performer to stage a solo concert in the said venue. On November 18, Espanto was one of the singers performing at a state dinner for a delegation from Mexico. Also in November 2015, Espanto was chosen to perform the official theme song for the Asia-Pacific Economic Cooperation (APEC) Economic Leaders' Meeting titled, "This is Only the Beginning", composed by Mr. Ryan Cayabyab.

In 2016, Espanto released his sophomore album "Be With Me". The album contains 11 songs from the singer, two of which are his original compositions. On July 31, 2016, Espanto opened for the Philippine leg of Selena Gomez's Revival tour.

On May 4, 2017, during his Twitter party, Espanto surprised his fans with a deluxe edition of his sophomore solo album entitled Be With Me, to be released the following day. Be With Me (Deluxe Edition) contains 5 bonus tracks: "I’ll Be There" with Jed Madela, Acoustic versions of "7 Minutes" and "Alam", the viral hit, his cover of Sia's "Chandelier", and a stripped version of Young Hearts with Malaysian pop singer Nik Qistina.

In 2018, Espanto made his acting debut in The Hows of Us. Espanto also became a member of the teen pop group ASAP G! Other members of the group are Isabela Vinzon, Jayda Avanzado, Ylona Garcia, Jeremy Glinoga and Kyle Echarri. The group formed on June 3, 2018, and disbanded in November 2018, when the show was reformatted into ASAP Natin 'To.

In 2019, Espanto was part of The Aces concert with fellow singers Lani Misalucha and Jonalyn Viray. The trio performed in Cebu, Davao, and Manila (at the Araneta Coliseum). Espanto and Viray, so called the Pair of Aces, also conducted a tour in Canada (Calgary, Winnipeg and Toronto) in the latter part of the year. On April 12, he also appeared as the only Filipino guest performer in the grand finals of Singer 2019 in China. This was followed by the release of "A Whole New World" on May 24, wherein he and Morissette collaborated to perform the rendition of the song as part of the Philippine promotion of the movie Aladdin as handpicked by Disney. On November 25, the theme song for the ASEAN-ROK Commemorative Summit titled "Side by Side" was launched, where he participated as one of the 11 ASEAN singers representing each member country. And on November 29, he released his single "Sasagipin Kita" which he wrote himself, also under MCA Music Inc. (Philippines) where it debuted at number 1 on the Philippine charts of Apple's iTunes store on the first day of its release.

In the early part of 2020, Espanto was set to participate in the Singer 2020 competition in China, but the plan was later on cancelled due to the COVID-19 outbreak and related travel bans. On April 15, 2020, the United Nations Development Programme (under its Philippine office) launched Espanto as its first-ever celebrity Youth Advocate to promote its SDGs, focusing on climate action, biodiversity conservation and youth empowerment. On May 24, 2020, Espanto celebrated his 19th birthday through an online benefit concert entitled "D Birthday Concert from Home". The concert was streamed live via Espanto's Facebook page and garnered around 12,000 viewers and 251,000 views. Through this event, he was able to raise P838,206.69 which was donated to his home network, ABS-CBN Pantawid ng Pag-ibig program. On June 12, 2020, Espanto, in his capacity as UNDP Philippines Youth Advocate, became part of United Nations Development Programme's #Mission1Point5 climate action global campaign in coordination with The Good Co. via its social media platforms (@thegoodquote) with millions of followers worldwide. On June 14, 2020, Espanto joined the iWant ASAP Online show as host along with the iWant ASAP squad, Robi Domingo, Maymay Entrata and Edward Barber (actor), weekly episode of which airs every Sunday. On July 31, 2020, Espanto and Jayda Avanzado released a collaboration for the track revival "Sana Tayo Na" under Star Music followed by the release of the official music video on the same day. On August 12, 2020, Espanto, also in his capacity as UNDP Youth Advocate, was invited as a keynote speaker for the International Youth Day Youth Forum 2020 with the theme "Building a Better Normal with the Youth", in coordination with IdeasPositive. This event was streamed live via the Facebook Page of Ideas Positive and partners. On October 23, 2020, Espanto as UNDP Youth Advocate, together with Ria Atayde, hosted the UN75 anniversary celebration in the Philippines with the theme "UN75 2020 & Beyond: Shaping the Future Together", which was streamed live via the UN Philippines's FB Page. On November 13, 2020, Espanto released his Christmas single, "Believe in Christmas", under MCA Music Inc. (Philippines). The song reached the number 1 spot of Apple's iTunes store Philippine charts just two hours after its debut. The official music video was released a week after and hit more than a 100,000 views within days after its upload on YouTube.

On February 13, 2021, Espanto released his cover of LANY's song entitled, "If This Is The Last Time", as part of a project with various artists under MCA Music Inc. (Philippines), in coordination with Universal Music Group. On February 20, 2021, Espanto and AC Bonifacio joined the Your Face Sounds Familiar (Philippine season 3) family as online hosts via the KaFamiliar Online and other digital platforms, weekly episode of which airs every Saturday and Sunday. On April 18, 2021, Espanto did a homecoming production on ASAP Natin 'To where he was formally launched as "Asia's Pop Heartthrob" Darren. On May 28, 2021, Espanto released his newest single written and produced by Zack Tabudlo with the title, "Tama Na", under MCA Music Inc. (Philippines). The song climbed to number 3 of Apple's iTunes store Philippines in the first two hours of its release. On June 9, 2021, Espanto was launched as the main host for the weekly online show for TNT PH called TNT PopShow, along with co-host Adrianna So. On June 19, 2021, Espanto has successfully held a sold-out digital concert called "Darren: Home Run (The Comeback Concert)". A re-run of this event was made available on June 20, 2021. Also on June 20, 2021, Espanto and his team released the official music video of "Tama Na" which secured the top spot of music videos on Apple's iTunes store Philippines a day after its release, and reached Top 10 of YouTube's trending videos in music on its first week. On July 11, 2021, Espanto was the special guest performer on the 2021 Bb. Pilipinas' Coronation Night where he performed "Together We Fly" composed and re-arranged by Ms. Chochay Magno. On August 27, 2021, Star Music released the "Marry Me, Marry You" official soundtrack album which includes tracks interpreted by various artists including Espanto who interpreted the main OST of the series also entitled "Marry Me, Marry You". The song skyrocketed to number 10 of the Apple's iTunes store on the day of its release. On September 29, 2021, Espanto was reappointed as UNDP Philippines' Youth Advocate for the SDGs for a second term, focusing on climate action, biodiversity conservation and youth empowerment. On November 21, 2021, Espanto performed in one of the world's grandest World Expo, the Expo 2020 Dubai, representing the Philippines along with December Avenue. On November 23, 2021, ABS-CBN, in partnership with iQIYI Philippines, announced its first original Filipino shows to be streamed via the iQIYI app. These include "Lyric and Beat", a teen musical show where Espanto will be part of the main casts along with Andrea Brillantes, Seth Fedelin, AC Bonifacio, Sheena Belarmino, Jeremy Glinoga and Angela Ken. The series will premiere in 2022. On November 26, 2021, Espanto appeared as one of the special guests in Maymay Entrata's "MPowered" virtual concert.

On January 16, 2022, Espanto was the featured performer on the "By Request (a Benefit Concert)" series launched by ABS-CBN for the victims of Typhoon Odette, where a total of P464,000 donation was raised. On January 28, 2022, Espanto was the guest performer of Angeline Quinto in her 10Q: Ten Years of Angeline Quinto concert series streamed live via KTX.ph, along with Gary Valenciano. On April 1, 2022, Espanto released his latest track, "Pabalik Sa'yo" under UMUSIC Philippines. The track and the lyric video claimed the No. 3 and No. 1 spots of Apple's iTunes store Philippines an hour after its release. On April 26, 2022, Espanto was part of the special guests of P-pop group Calista's debut concert Vax to Normal. Espanto is also part of the EZ Mil: Panalo Homecoming Tour 2022 which kicked off on April 29, 2022, at the New Frontier Theater. On June 9, 2022, Espanto is one of the Southeast Asian artists who collaborated with English music sensation, Calum Scott for the version of Scott's track, "Heaven". The song climbed to No. 2 of iTunes store Philippines immediately after its release. On June 11, 2022, Espanto is also one of Anne Curtis' guest artists in her Luv-Anne: The Comeback Concert held at the Resorts World Manila. In July 2022, Espanto was part of Vice Ganda's Fully VICE-cinated US Tour 2022 which includes performances in California, Seattle and New Jersey. On July 8, 2022, Republic Records Philippines was launched and it will house known recording artists, including Espanto. The same date, the teaser for Lyric and Beat, a musical series under Dreamscape Entertainment was released which stars Espanto among the main casts. The series premiered on August 10, 2022, on iWantTFC. Among the series' soundtracks, "Pagbigyang Muli" and "Duyan" interpreted by Espanto reached No. 5 of iTunes store Philippines' Top Songs a few hours after their release. On September 12, 2022, the Bacolod City government unveiled the music video of "Smile Again" or "Balik Yuhum", the official theme song interpreted by Espanto for the Masskara Festival 2022, a grand annual festival celebrated in the province of Negros Occidental. On October 1, 2022, Espanto joined the line-up of world-class Filipino artists in the first-ever 1MX music festival in London, which showcased the Filipino culture, food and music in one event. On October 12, 2022, the digital version of "Smile Again" was released in various streaming platforms. The same day, the music video for "First Day Vibe", a collaboration theme song for an endorsement with AC Bonifacio and "Lyric and Beat" was released under Star Music. The digital version of the song was released in September 2022. Also on October 12, Espanto's cover of "Top of the World", the theme song from Columbia Pictures Philippines' animated movie, Lyle, Lyle, Crocodile starring Shawn Mendes, was released. On October 15, 2022, Espanto was one of the guest artists in the 20th Anniversary Concert of one of OPM's well-known songwriters and hitmakers, Jonathan Manalo, titled "Mr. Music: The Hits of Jonathan Manalo". On October 20, 2022, Espanto was the special guest in Calum Scott's Bridges Asia Tour Live in Manila where the two performed their collaboration "Heaven". On November 19, 2022, Espanto was part of the search for the Next Global Pop Group program, "Dream Maker" which ran until February 2023, as one of its Pinoy Dream Mentors. On December 3, 2023, Espanto was one of the Pinoy pop acts who opened for the K-pop group sensation ENHYPEN in their "Fun Meet in Manila" held at the Araneta Coliseum.

At the early part of 2023, Espanto has already performed in various events such as New Year's Eve (SM Mall of Asia) and Chinese New Year Countdowns (Chinatown), and national festivities. On February 21, 2023, Espanto was launched as the newest Hurado in "Tawag ng Tanghalan", a segment of It's Showtime (Philippine TV program), a daily noontime show airing on Kapamilya Channel and A2Z Channel 11.

Filmography

Television

Digital

Film

Discography

Studio albums

Special albums

Singles

Promotional singles

Legacy

Dubbed as “Asia's Pop Hearthrob” by various media outlets, Espanto was the youngest artist to headline a sold-out solo major concert at MOA Arena. He has accumulated over 70 awards and recognitions including 15 Wish Music Awards, 8 Awit Awards, 8 Myx Music Awards, 8 Push Awards and 7 EdukCricle Awards. He performed for Pope Francis during the 2015 Papal Visit in UST. He has also headlined a gala at the legendary Carnegie Hall in New York and performed for presidents and dignitaries during the ASEAN Summits and APEC. He was recently appointed as the first celebrity Youth Advocate for the Sustainable Development Goals (SDGs).

Espanto is one of the country's most successful & top-selling artists of the decade, Billboard reported that his self-titled debut album “Darren” has been certified 2× Platinum in the Philippines, selling over 30,000 units in the country, while his sophomore release “Be With Me” sold 15,000 units (certified Gold) respectively.

Chart performance

Concerts

Solo concerts

Affiliated concerts

Notes

References

External links

2001 births
Living people
Canadian child singers
Canadian children's musicians
Canadian male actors of Filipino descent
Canadian pop singers
Citizens of the Philippines through descent
Musicians from Calgary
Naturalized citizens of Canada
ABS-CBN personalities
Star Magic
MCA Music Inc. (Philippines) artists
The Voice Kids (Philippine TV series) contestants
21st-century Filipino singers
21st-century Canadian male singers